The  is a museum of contemporary architecture and design located in Imabari, Ehime Prefecture.

The two small museum buildings, named Steel Hut and Silver Hut, both designed by Pritzker Prize winning architect Toyo Ito, are located on a promontory on Ōmishima, a small island in the middle of the Seto Inland Sea.  Opened in 2011, the museum hosts exhibits and educational programs relating both to the work of Toyo Ito, regional development and other themes in Japanese contemporary architecture.

References

External links
 

2011 establishments in Japan
Museums in Ehime Prefecture
Toyo Ito buildings
Architecture museums in Japan
Museums established in 2011
Imabari, Ehime